Jan Behrendt (born 29 November 1967 in Ilmenau, Bezirk Suhl) is an East German-German luger who competed from the mid-1980s to 1998. Together with Stefan Krauße he won two Olympic gold medals (1992, 1998), one silver medal (1988) and one bronze (1994) in men's doubles.

In addition, they won eleven medals at the FIL World Luge Championships with seven golds (Men's doubles: 1989, 1991, 1993, 1995; Mixed team: 1991, 1993, 1995) and four silvers (Men's doubles: 1997, Mixed team: 1989, 1996, 1997). At the FIL European Luge Championships, they won a total of six medals with four golds (Men's doubles: 1996, 1998; Mixed team: 1996, 1998) and two bronzes (Men's doubles: 1990, 1992).

They won the overall Luge World Cup men's doubles title three times (1993–94, 1994–95, 1995–96).

Behrendt and Krausse retired after the 1998 Olympics. The same year they were proclaimed honorary citizens of Ilmenau.

References

1967 births
Living people
People from Ilmenau
People from Bezirk Suhl
German male lugers
Sportspeople from Thuringia
Olympic lugers of East Germany
Olympic lugers of Germany
National People's Army military athletes
Lugers at the 1988 Winter Olympics
Lugers at the 1992 Winter Olympics
Lugers at the 1994 Winter Olympics
Lugers at the 1998 Winter Olympics
Olympic medalists in luge
Medalists at the 1988 Winter Olympics
Medalists at the 1992 Winter Olympics
Medalists at the 1994 Winter Olympics
Medalists at the 1998 Winter Olympics
Olympic gold medalists for Germany
Olympic silver medalists for East Germany
Olympic bronze medalists for Germany
Recipients of the Patriotic Order of Merit in silver